Montana Management is a trust fund once owned by Saddam Hussein.  It has a 2% holding in the Lagardère Group; however all its holdings are frozen.

Not coincidentally, "Montana Management Company" was also the name of a money-laundering front company controlled by fictional drug lord Tony Montana (Al Pacino) in the 1983 film Scarface.  Saddam and his sons Uday Hussein and Qusay Hussein were allegedly big fans of the film.

External links
 

Holding companies of Iraq
Iraq–United States relations
Saddam Hussein